Rahat Indori, born as Rahat Qureshi, (1 January 1950 – 11 August 2020) was an Indian Bollywood lyricist and Urdu poet. He was also a former professor of Urdu language and a painter. Prior to this he was a pedagogist of Urdu literature at DAVV.

Biography
Indori was born on 1 January 1950, in Indore to Rafatullah Qureshi (a cloth mill worker), and his wife Maqbool Un Nisa Begum. He was their fourth child. Rahat Indori did his schooling from Nutan School Indore from where he completed his Higher Secondary.
He completed his graduation from Islamia Karimia College, Indore in 1973 and has passed his MA in Urdu literature from Barkatullah University with a gold medal. (Bhopal, Madhya Pradesh) in 1975.  Rahat was awarded a PhD in Urdu literature from the Bhoj University of Madhya Pradesh in 1985 for his thesis titled Urdu Main Mushaira.

Indori performed in Mushaira and Kavi Sammelan for 40 – 45 years. He traveled widely internationally to recite poetry. He attended poetic symposiums in almost all the districts of India and has traveled multiple times to the US, UK, Australia, Canada, Singapore, Mauritius, Saudi Arabia, UAE, Kuwait, Qatar, Bahrain, Oman, Pakistan, Bangladesh, Nepal etc.

He tested positive for COVID-19 during the COVID-19 pandemic in India on 10 August 2020, and was admitted to Aurobindo Hospital in Indore, Madhya Pradesh. He died from cardiac arrest a day later on 11 August 2020.

Media appearances
Indori was invited as a guest in The Kapil Sharma Show twice. First, on 1 July 2017 episode of Season 1 along with Kumar Vishwas and Shabinaji; and second time with Ashok Chakradhar on 21 July 2019 episode of Season 2. Indori was also invited in the show Wah! Wah! Kya Baat Hai! on SAB TV.

His couplet Bulati Hai Magar Jaane Ka Nahi became viral and started trending on Facebook, Twitter and Instagram during 2020 Valentines week. People started using this phrase as a meme. Another popular couplet, Kisi Ke Baap Ka Hindustan Thodi Hai, became viral on social media.

In 2016, a book on Rahat Indori 'Mere Baad' was released at the Oxford Bookstore in Connaught Place, Delhi. This book is a compilation of his Ghazals and Shayari.

On 1 January 2021, his 71st birthday, songdew.com unveiled a unique tribute titled Dr Rahat Indori - Ek Alag Pehchaan. As part of this unique tribute 9 famous artists of India and ( Indie musicians came together to compose 9 of the famous ghazals written by Dr Indori and create paintings inspired by his writing.

Filmography

Works

References

External links
 
 
 

Urdu-language lyricists
Urdu-language poets from India
Writers from Indore
Indian Muslims
Poets from Madhya Pradesh
Indian male poets
Hindi-language lyricists
20th-century Indian poets
20th-century Indian male writers
1950 births
2020 deaths
Deaths from the COVID-19 pandemic in India
https://shayariline.com